The following article presents a summary of the 1983 football (soccer) season in Brazil, which was the 82nd season of competitive football in the country.

Campeonato Brasileiro Série A

Quarterfinals

|}

Semifinals

|}

Final

Flamengo declared as the Campeonato Brasileiro champions by aggregate score of 4–2.

Relegation
The worst placed team in each one of the eight groups in the first stage plus the four clubs eliminated in the qualification/relegation playoff, which are Brasília, CSA, Ferroviário, Fortaleza, Galícia, Joinville, Juventus, Mixto, Moto Club, Paysandu, Rio Branco-ES and Treze, were relegated to the same year's second level.

Campeonato Brasileiro Série B

Quarterfinals

|}

Semifinals

|}

Final

Juventus declared as the Campeonato Brasileiro Série B champions by aggregate score of 5–3.

Promotion
The first placed team in each one of the four groups in the second stage, which were Guarani, Uberaba, Americano and Botafogo-SP, were promoted to the same season's first level's second stage. Juventus and CSA would be promoted to the following year's first level, but eventually, their promotions were cancelled.

State championship champions

Youth competition champions

Other competition champions

Brazilian clubs in international competitions

Brazil national team
The following table lists all the games played by the Brazil national football team in official competitions and friendly matches during 1983.

Women's football

Domestic competition champions

References

 Brazilian competitions at RSSSF
 1983 Brazil national team matches at RSSSF

 
Seasons in Brazilian football
Brazil